Self-portrait in a circle of friends from Mantua is an oil painting on canvas by Peter Paul Rubens, produced between 1602 and 1605. It measures 77.5 cm by 101 cm. It is now in the Wallraf-Richartz Museum in Cologne. From left to right it shows Frans Pourbus, Caspar Schoppe, William Richardot, the painter's brother Philip or Filippo Rubens, Rubens himself, and Justus Lipsius.

References

1604 paintings
Portraits by Peter Paul Rubens
Collections of the Wallraf–Richartz Museum
Gonzaga art collection